Joseph Barton may refer to:

 Joe Barton (born 1949), American politician
 Joseph Barton (cricketer) (1860–1945), English cricketer
 Joe Barton (soccer) (born 1981), American soccer player
 Joey Barton (born 1982), English footballer
 Joseph Barton, character in Eden (Steve Carter play)
 Joe Barton (screenwriter), British TV writer